European Greens – Green Italy  has been a political alliance in Italy between the Federation of the Greens and Green Italia, constituted for the 2014 European election.   
    
The list was initially excluded to not have picked up the 30,000 signatures necessary for the candidacy in every of the five Italian districts. The list has subsequently been readmitted to the electoral competition following provision of the Court of Cassation that has recognized the exemption from the obligation of harvest of the signatures because the list is already expression of the present European Green Party in the European Parliament.

The list finally got 0.9% of the vote and no seats in the European Parliament. However it came fifth with 6.0% among Italians abroad, with particularly good results in Austria (12.2%), Spain (8.8%) and France (7.5%).

References

2014 establishments in Italy
Political parties established in 2014
Defunct political party alliances in Italy
Federation of the Greens